Tom Krister Kristensson (born 30 April 1991) is a Swedish rally driver, who drives in the Junior World Rally Championship. He is originally from Lund, but now lives in Hörby.

In 2016 and 2017, Kristensson competed in the ADAC Opel Rallye Cup, finishing second in 2016 and winning 2017 championship.

In the 2019 season of JWRC, Tom finished second behind Jan Solans. The next season he went on to become the 2020 Junior World Rally champion.

Career results

WRC results
 
* Season still in progress.

WRC-2 results

JWRC results

ADAC Opel Rallye Cup results

References

External links
 

Living people
1991 births
Swedish rally drivers
Sportspeople from Lund
European Rally Championship drivers

M-Sport drivers